Peter Charles Allday (27 June 1927 – 10 March 2018) was a British athlete. He competed in the men's hammer throw at the 1952 Summer Olympics and the 1956 Summer Olympics. He represented England and won a bronze medal in the hammer throw at the 1958 British Empire and Commonwealth Games in Cardiff, Wales.

References

1927 births
2018 deaths
Athletes (track and field) at the 1952 Summer Olympics
Athletes (track and field) at the 1956 Summer Olympics
British male hammer throwers
English male hammer throwers
Olympic athletes of Great Britain
People from Wandsworth
Athletes from London
Commonwealth Games medallists in athletics
Commonwealth Games bronze medallists for England
Athletes (track and field) at the 1954 British Empire and Commonwealth Games
Athletes (track and field) at the 1958 British Empire and Commonwealth Games
Medallists at the 1958 British Empire and Commonwealth Games